Pessocosma prolalis is a moth in the  family Crambidae. It is found on the Seychelles, where it has been recorded from Aldabra, Cosmoledo and Menai.

References

Moths described in 1958
Spilomelinae